Josselin is a commune in the Morbihan department in Brittany in north-western France.

History

St Meriadek is said to have founded a chapel there during the 4th century. Much later Josselin became a stronghold of the House of Rohan.

An alternative explanation for the location of the chapel concerns a labourer who in 808 discovered a wooden statue in the brambles which enabled his hitherto blind daughter to see.  A chapel was constructed on the site of this miracle which subsequently grew into a church (parts of which date back to the twelfth century). A fresco in the church now recalls the Combat of the Thirty summarized below.

In 1351, during the Breton War of Succession (part of the Hundred Years' War), two groups of approximately 30 English knights (led by Robert Bramborough, the English captain of Ploërmel) and Franco-Breton knights (commanded by Jean de Beaumanoir, captain of Josselin) staged an arranged combat at a spot halfway between the Chateau de Josselin and Ploërmel.  The Franco-Breton side eventually won after killing or capturing the English force, including Bramborough. This episode was later known as the Combat of the Thirty.

The Castle of Josselin can still be seen today, although only four of the original nine towers remain after the Cardinal Richelieu ordered the castle partially demolished in 1629.

Demographics
Inhabitants of Josselin are called Josselinais.

Breton language
In 2008, 16.05% of children attended the bilingual schools in primary education.

Twin towns
Josselin is twinned with: 
 Alzey, Germany 
 Tard, Hungary
 Brechin, Scotland, UK

See also
 Communes of the Morbihan department

References

External links

  
 
 Mayors of Morbihan Association 

Communes of Morbihan